Flavin mononucleotide (FMN), or riboflavin-5′-phosphate, is a biomolecule produced from riboflavin (vitamin B2) by the enzyme riboflavin kinase and functions as the prosthetic group of various oxidoreductases, including NADH dehydrogenase, as well as cofactor in biological blue-light photo receptors. During the catalytic cycle, a reversible interconversion of the oxidized (FMN), semiquinone (FMNH•), and reduced (FMNH2) forms occurs in the various oxidoreductases. FMN is a stronger oxidizing agent than NAD and is particularly useful because it can take part in both one- and two-electron transfers. In its role as blue-light photo receptor, (oxidized) FMN stands out from the 'conventional' photo receptors as the signaling state and not an E/Z isomerization.

It is the principal form in which riboflavin is found in cells and tissues. It requires more energy to produce, but is more soluble than riboflavin. In cells, FMN occurs freely circulating but also in several covalently bound forms. Covalently or non-covalently bound FMN is a cofactor of many enzymes playing an important pathophysiological role in cellular metabolism. For example dissociation of flavin mononucleotide from mitochondrial complex I has been shown to occur during ischemia/reperfusion brain injury during  stroke.

Food additive
Flavin mononucleotide is also used as an orange-red food colour additive, designated in Europe as E number E101a.

E106, a very closely related food dye, is riboflavin-5′-phosphate sodium salt, which consists mainly of the monosodium salt of the 5′-monophosphate ester of riboflavin. It is rapidly turned to free riboflavin after ingestion.  It is found in many foods for babies and young children as well as jams, milk products, and sweets and sugar products.

See also
 Flavin adenine dinucleotide

References

External links
FMN in the EBI Macromolecular Structure Database

Flavins
Food colorings
Organophosphates
Oxidoreductases
Cofactors